Zalizna Lastivka (Ukrainian: Залізна ластівка, English: Iron Swallow) is the 3rd studio album by the Ukrainian band The Hardkiss. It released on September 19, 2018.

Background 
According to the Hardkiss, work on the album lasted for two years. The album consists of 13 songs and 4 poems, most of which are in Ukrainian. The band began producing the album on February 21, 2017 on International Mother Language Day, by first presenting their song "Антарктида".

On July 21, 2017, the Hardkiss would release the band's lead single, "Журавлі". A music video was also released on YouTube that day. The music video would become a viral sensation in Ukraine, garnering over 24 million views as of October 5, 2021. The song would help the band win the Yuna and Gold Firebird Awards, along with the 2017 M1 Music Awards. According to Julia Sanina, the band's lead vocalist, the song was created in a hotel room in 20 minutes. In an article, she said that the song was different than what fans expect from The Hardkiss musically.

Between the fall of 2017 and the spring of 2018, the band would release two more songs, both in Ukrainian: "Кораблі" and "Мелодія", respectively. After releasing the two songs, the band realized their musical style would change slightly. Sanina would describe the new album as "a whole cocoon, in which its atmosphere prevails."

Track listing

Reception 
Reception for the album was mainly positive from both fans and music critics. Igov Panasov of Karabas Live reported that "If you don't know how to tell stories, don't release albums... The Hardkiss is just made for big beautiful stories. But for many years [Sanina] was not up to it. Under the guise of albums, [Sanina] released mechanical compilations - Stones And Honey (2014), Cold Altair (EP, 2015), Perfection Is A Lie (2017). There was nothing special to tell about [the albums]. Until today."

References 

Albums by Ukrainian artists